Heyrovský may refer to:

 People with the surname
 Jaroslav Heyrovský (1890–1967), Czech chemist and inventor
 Leopold Heyrovský (1892–1976), Czech entomologist and lawyer

 Other uses
 Heyrovsky (crater), a lunar crater
 3069 Heyrovský, an asteroid